Replica Replica, released on 21 October 2006, is the debut album from Australian indie rockers, Red Riders. It appeared via Ivy League Records and peaked at No. 9 on the ARIA Hitseekers Albums Chart. The album was produced by Woody Annison (Pound System, Rocket Science), recorded at Rockinghorse Studios in Byron Bay, and mixed at Studio 01 in Melbourne.

Track listing

 "C'mon" - 3:03
 "Slide In Next to Me" - 3:06
 "A.S.P.I.R.I.N" - 3:50
 "In My Sleep" - 4:31
 "My Love Is Stronger Than Your Love" - 3:00
 "Crawl Back Baby" - 4:18
 "What They Say About Us" - 2:48
 "Scream" - 3:45
 "Live in the Stars" - 3:35
 "Daylight" - 5:20

References 

2006 debut albums
Red Riders albums
Ivy League Records albums